Amnayas are holy scriptures belonging to the Tantra school of Hinduism which is rooted in the Vedas. Āmnāya (आम्नाय) is a Sanskrit word, which means sacred tradition that is, unchanging atemporal tradition, handed over by repetition or that which is committed to memory.

Āmnāya (आम्नाय) refers to a classification of Kula Agama scriptures, mostly tantras belonging to the Kula tradition within Shaivism and Saktism. The oldest and commonly accepted classification of four āmnāyas is found in sources such as the Kubjikāmatatantra, the Manthānabhairavatantra (yogakhaṇḍa) and the Saṃketapaddhati.

These are the four āmnāyas, each corresponding with a direction and yuga:
 Pūrvāmnāya (eastern doctrine, Satya Yuga),
 Dakṣiṇāmnāya (southern doctrine, Treta Yuga),
 Uttarāmnāya (northern doctrine, Dvapara Yuga),
 Paścimāmnāya (western doctrine, Kali Yuga).
There are however, different classifications of āmnāya counting up to five or six and considered very secret.  Urdhwamnaya the Quarter Above and Anuttaramnaya, the Quarter Beyond are the fifth and sixth secretive Amnayas. As per tantras the six Amnayas are nothing but six faces of Lord Shiva. Four of these are easily revealed but fifth and sixth faces are hidden and secret.

References

 

Hindu philosophical concepts
Hindu texts